Soltane Ghalbha (literally: King of Hearts) is a 1968 melodrama Iranian film directed by Mohammad Ali Fardin and starring Azar Shiva, Victoria Nerssisian, Leila Forouhar and Mohammad Ali Fardin. Aref Arefkia and Ahdieh did the singing voices of the film and dubbed the lead performers. The film's songs and lyrics were composed by pianist Anoushiravan Rohani.

Plot 
A young couple lives apart for years during an accident, each assuming that their spouse has died. The man becomes a famous singer and the woman loses her sight in an accident. Years later, the man happens to meet a girl and, without knowing what the girl has to do with him, treats the girl's mother and his wife. The man intends to marry a wealthy woman, but on the wedding night, the wife and child come to thank him, and thus the old couple find each other again after a long time and start a new life together.

Cast
Mohammad Ali Fardin
Azar Shiva
Leila Forouhar
Homayun
Victoria
Habibollah Bolur
Jamhsid Mehrdad
Niktaj Sabri

Soundtrack 
 Soltane Ghalbha (Aref)

References

External links
 

1968 films
1960s Persian-language films
Iranian drama films
1960s musical drama films
Iranian black-and-white films
Films about blind people
Films about poverty
1968 drama films